Nikolay Aleksandrovich Chub (born 10 June 1984 in Novocherkassk, RSFSR, USSR, now Russia) is a cosmonaut selected by the Roscosmos space agency in 2012.

Biography
Prior to selection as a cosmonaut, Chub obtained a degree in management and informatics from the South-Russian State Technical University (Novocherkassk Polytechnic Institute) in 2006 as the top member of his class.  He subsequently obtained a graduate degree in economics from the same institution.

Prior to his selection as a cosmonaut, Chub directed the astronautics firm Space Tu, LLC.  He was selected as a cosmonaut candidate in 2012 and was named a test cosmonaut on June 16, 2014.

In 2019 Chub participated to the training ESA CAVES, organized by the European Space Agency, held between Italy and Slovenia.

Chub trained as a backup crewmember for the Soyuz MS-12 flight to the International Space Station, and in accordance with his Roscosmos biography, had been selected as a crewmember for the Soyuz MS-17 mission, but was subsequently replaced by American astronaut Kathleen Rubins.

In January 2022, cosmonaut Nikolai Chub was denied without explanation a visa to the United States to visit the Johnson Space Center and holding a five-week session there to get acquainted with the American segment of the ISS. Roscosmos considered that the decision of the American side threatens the safety of the astronaut on the ISS. After the publication of this information in the media, a visa to cosmonaut Chub for a trip to the United States was issued a few days later.

Chub was again assigned as a backup crewmember for Soyuz MS-22 and is now expected to fly on  MS-24.

References

External links
 Astronaut.ru biography
 Roscosmos biography
 SPACEFACTS biography

People from Novocherkassk
Living people
1984 births
Russian cosmonauts